Events from the year 1908 in Sweden

Incumbents
 Monarch – Gustaf V
 Prime Minister - Arvid Lindman

Events
 18 February -  Inauguration of the new building of the Royal Dramatic Theatre.
 11 December - The Swedish Cross-Country Skiing Association is founded in Sundsvall.
 - First female psychiatrist: Alfhild Tamm
 - The first women are employed in the Swedish Police Authority.
 - Karolina Olsson awakes from 32 years of hibernation.

Births

 26 January - Gideon Ståhlberg, chess grandmaster  (died 1967)

Deaths
 Amalia Planck, entrepreneur (born 1834)
 8 June - Frans Hedberg, dramatist  (born 1828)

References

 
Years of the 20th century in Sweden
Sweden